The West Bay City Shipbuilding Company was founded in 1876 at West Bay City, Michigan (now part of Bay City) by Frank W. Wheeler who was a ship captain on the Great Lakes, a shipbuilder and a politician. The yard started life as Wheeler & Crane. In 1880 it was renamed to F. W. Wheeler Company, and in 1889 it was renamed again to Frank W. Wheeler & Company. It was based on the Saginaw River close to Third Street. In 1899 Captain Frank W. Wheeler sold his yard to the American Ship Building Company who renamed the yard West Bay City Shipbuilding Company. The yard closed in 1908 after they built the steamer W.R. Woodford.

Ships built

References

Defunct shipbuilding companies of the United States